The Shenandoah-class destroyer tenders were a class of destroyer tenders built for the United States Navy that served from 1945 to 1984.

History
The Shenandoah-class destroyer tenders were modified United States Maritime Commission Type C3-class ships. None of the ships saw service during World War II,  and  directly entered the Reserve Fleet, finally being commissioned in 1950 and in 1962.

Ships in class

See also
 , 
 , Alcor-class destroyer tender

References

 
Auxiliary ship classes of the United States Navy
Auxiliary depot ship classes